Srivilliputhur is an assembly constituency located in Virudhunagar district in Tamil Nadu. It comes under Tenkasi Lok Sabha Constituency. P. S. Kumaraswamy Raja, former Chief Minister of Madras State was defeated in this constituency in 1952 election. It is one of the 234 State Legislative Assembly Constituencies in Tamil Nadu, in India.

Madras State assembly

Tamil Nadu assembly

Election results

2021

2016

2011

2006

2001

1996

1991

1989

1984

1980

1977

1971

1967

1962

1957

1952

References 

 
 

Assembly constituencies of Tamil Nadu
Virudhunagar district